Amod is a town in the Bharuch district, Gujarat, India. Its population is about 30,000.

Shah N.N.M.C.High School is in Amod.

Demographics of the Bharuch district 
According to the 2011 census Bharuch district has a population of 1,550,822, roughly equal to the nation of Gabon or the US state of Hawaii. This gives it a ranking of 321st in India (out of a total of 640). Its population growth rate over the decade 2001-2011 was  13.14%.	Bharuch	has a sex ratio of 	924	females for every 1000 males, and a literacy rate of 83.03%.

The primary religious grouping is Hinduism, although Muslims make a significant minority in the district at 27%. This area is also home to the Muslim Vohra Patel community.

References

Bharuch district
Cities and towns in Bharuch district